Gökçeören (also Gökçeören Köyü and Gökçedere) is a village in the central (Balıkesir) district of Balıkesir Province, Turkey.

References

Villages in Balıkesir Province